Andrew Brian Goode (born 30 January 1960) is a retired badminton player from England.

Badminton career 
Goode represented England and won a gold medal in the team event and two silver medals in the men's and mixed doubles, at the 1986 Commonwealth Games in Edinburgh, Scotland.

In 1990, Goode who won the men's and mixed doubles title at the National Championships, had been left out of the England team for the European Championships in Moscow. He later won two more medals in the team event and mixed doubles at the 1990 Commonwealth Games in Auckland, New Zealand.

He also competed for Great Britain in the 1992 Summer Olympics. Goode won nine titles at the English National Badminton Championships (1 singles, 5 men's doubles and 3 mixed doubles).

Personal life 
He married Joanne Wright, an English badminton player who was five times National doubles champion. They have three children  named Jack, Molly, and Harry.

Achievements

World Cup 
Mixed doubles

Commonwealth Games 
Men's doubles

Mixed doubles

European Championships 
Men's doubles

European Junior Championships 
Boys' singles

IBF World Grand Prix 
The World Badminton Grand Prix sanctioned by International Badminton Federation (IBF) since 1983.

Men's doubles

Mixed doubles

IBF International 
Men's singles

Men's doubles

Mixed doubles

Open Tournament 
Men's singles

Men's doubles

Mixed doubles

References

External links 
 
 
 
 
 
 

Living people
1960 births
Sportspeople from Welwyn Garden City
English male badminton players
Badminton players at the 1992 Summer Olympics
Olympic badminton players of Great Britain
Badminton players at the 1986 Commonwealth Games
Badminton players at the 1990 Commonwealth Games
Commonwealth Games gold medallists for England
Commonwealth Games silver medallists for England
Commonwealth Games bronze medallists for England
Commonwealth Games medallists in badminton
Medallists at the 1986 Commonwealth Games
Medallists at the 1990 Commonwealth Games